Barry Seymour Gomersall (1945–2007) was an Australian rugby league referee. Gomersall refereed six rugby league internationals and nine State of Origin series matches.

Nicknamed "the Grasshopper", Gomersall was known for his thin legs inside tight shorts and his habit of ignoring on-field fights. First appointed to referee State of Origin by the Queensland Rugby League in 1982, Gomersall was often accused by New South Wales supporters of bias. A reporter from New South Wales once asked: "How do you account for the fact that in your nine matches Queensland won seven and NSW won only two?", Gomersall was said to have replied "Well, surely anyone's entitled to two bad games." Gomersall placed a high priority on personal fitness saying "if someone is going to score a try, I want to be there first".

Gomersall was a long time Queensland Rail employee. After his refereeing career, Gomersall entered Queensland politics, standing for the electoral district of Mirani in five elections.

Barry Gomersall  died in Sarina in central Queensland on 9 February 2007   from prostate cancer aggravated by collision with livestock on his farm.

References

1945 births
2007 deaths
People from Queensland
Australian rugby league referees
Deaths from prostate cancer